Erythrolamprus aesculapii, also known commonly as the Aesculapian false coral snake, the South American false coral snake, and in Portuguese as bacorá, or falsa-coral, is a species of mildly venomous snake in the family Colubridae. The species is endemic to South America.

Etymology
The specific name, aesculapii, refers to Aesculapius, the Greek mythological god of medicine, who is depicted with a snake-entwined staff.

Geographic range
E. aesculapii is found in the Amazon rainforest of South America. It is also found on the island of Trinidad (in the Republic of Trinidad and Tobago).

Habitat and behavior

Diet
E. aesculapii feeds mainly on other snakes, including venomous species. It will also prey on lizards, fish and earthworms. Insects are probably consumed though secondary ingestion.

Venom
E. aesculapii is mildly venomous.

Mimicry
The brightly colored, ringed patterns of snakes of the genus Erythrolamprus resemble those of sympatric coral snakes of the genus Micrurus, and it has been suggested that this is due to mimicry. Whether this is classical Batesian mimicry, classical Müllerian mimicry, a modified form of Müllerian mimicry, or no mimicry at all, remains to be proven.

Subspecies
The following four subspecies are recognized as being valid, including the nominotypical subspecies:

Erythrolamprus aesculapii aesculapii (Linnaeus, 1758) – Amazon River Basin
Erythrolamprus aesculapii monozonus Jan, 1863 – Brazil (Bahia state to Rio de Janeiro state)
Erythrolamprus aesculapii tetrazonus Jan, 1863 – southwestern Bolivia
Erythrolamprus aesculapii venustissimus (Wied, 1821) – eastern Bolivia to southeastern Brazil and northeastern Argentina

References

Further reading

Linnaeus L (1758). Systema naturæ per regna tria naturæ, secundum classes, ordines, genera, species, cum characteribus, differentiis, synonymis, locis. Tomus I. Editio Decima, Reformata. Stockholm: L. Salvius. 824 pp. (Coluber æsculapii, new species, p. 220). (in Latin).

aesculapii
Fauna of the Amazon
Reptiles of Brazil
Reptiles of Bolivia
Reptiles of Argentina
Reptiles of Colombia
Reptiles of Ecuador
Reptiles of French Guiana
Reptiles of Peru
Reptiles of Paraguay
Reptiles of Trinidad and Tobago
Reptiles of Venezuela
Reptiles described in 1758
Taxa named by Carl Linnaeus